Callum Hemming (born 27 June 1999) is an English badminton player. He won the silver medals at the 2014 European U15 Championships in the boys' doubles event and 2016 European U17 Championships in the mixed team event. In 2017, he won his first senior title at the Iceland International tournament in the mixed doubles event.

Achievements

European Junior Championships 
Boys' doubles

BWF International Challenge/Series (5 titles, 4 runners-up) 
Men's doubles

Mixed doubles

  BWF International Challenge tournament
  BWF International Series tournament
  BWF Future Series tournament

References

External links 
 

1999 births
Living people
People from Milton Keynes
English male badminton players
Sportspeople from Buckinghamshire
Badminton players at the 2022 Commonwealth Games
Commonwealth Games competitors for England